Assaut de Saint-Pierre is a football and athletics club of Martinique, playing in the town of Saint-Pierre. Founded in 1942, the club's colours are blue and white.

History 
Assaut de Saint-Pierre was founded in 1942. The club enjoyed its most successful period in the 1960s, and was one of the strongest teams in Martinique and the French West Indies during this time. In this decade alone, the club won a total of fifteen trophies.

Notable former players 
1960s

 Yvon Chomet
 Yvon Lutbert
 Roger Lutbert
 Lucien Lafayette
 Gérard Alton
 Serge Martial
 Serge Belleroche
 Louis-Joseph Vestris
 Georges Bannais
 Yves Ramassamy
 Floriva Modeste
 Valentin Louison
 Marcel Aurélia
 Joseph Jean
Frédéric Betzi (manager)

1990s and 2000s

 Fabrice Reuperné
 Ludovic Mirande
 Yannick Ancarno

Honours 
 Martinique Championnat National:
 1963, 1966, 1967, 1968, 1973
 Coupe de la Martinique:
 1964, 1965, 1966, 1967, 1968, 2000
 Championnat Antilles-Guyane:
 1963, 1966, 1968
 Coupe de France zone Martinique:
 1966, 1985
 Coupe Théolade:
 1963, 1968

References

External links 
 Assaut de Saint-Pierre at Global Sports Archive
 Assaut de Saint-Pierre at Soccerway

Football clubs in Martinique
Association football clubs established in 1906
1906 establishments in Martinique